Sharon Smith may refer to:

Sharon Smith, mayor of Houston, British Columbia
Sharon Smith (sportscaster), television anchor for SportsCenter
Sharon Smith (writer), American Socialist writer and activist
Sharon Smith Bush, former wife of Neil Bush
Sharon Smyth, child actress on TV's Dark Shadows (Sarah Collins)
Sharon “Shari” Smith, American murder victim 
Sharon L. Smith, marine ecologist